Imjin Barracks is a military installation situated near Innsworth in Gloucestershire that is home to NATO's Allied Rapid Reaction Corps (ARRC).

The Barracks were named after the Battle of the Imjin River because of the connection with the Gloucestershire Regiment which formed part of the United Nations contingent in the Korean War, and was thought to be an appropriate name, for ARRC which is the HQ of a multinational force.

History
Imjin Barracks is located at the site RAF Innsworth which was a non-flying Royal Air Force station between 1940 and 2008.
The station opened in 1940, the first unit based there being No 7 School of Technical Training who trained engine and airframe fitters and mechanics.  In December 1941, No 2 WAAF Depot was opened at Innsworth and from then on the Station became increasingly associated with the Women's branch of the service. Eventually it was decided to reserve the Station almost exclusively for WAAF training, including barrage balloon training amongst other vital roles. In 1951 the Headquarters of the RAF Record Office which had been based nearby in Gloucester and Barnwood, moved to the station and gained Group status.  Three years later in 1954 No. 5 Personnel Despatch Unit arrived, charged with the administration and processing of personnel selected for overseas service.

Just after the war ended the RAF Base Accounts Office moved from York to Gloucester and grew into the Central Pay Office and became part of the RAF Personnel and Training Command, which formed in 1994, based at Innsworth. 

In 2005 it was announced that HQ Personnel and Training Command was to co-locate with HQ RAF Strike Command at RAF High Wycombe. The new collocated HQ's were subsequently merged to form Air Command and the decision was taken to close RAF Innsworth. The drawdown took place over the next three years with elements of the Personnel Management Agency moved to High Wycombe and RAF Cranwell. RAF Innsworth finally closed on 31 March 2008.

Army base
The Innsworth site is now managed by the Army and has been renamed Imjin Barracks.  When the RAF vacated the site in 2008, elements of AFPAA (renamed Defence Business Services in 2014) including the MoD Medal Office and Joint Casualty and Compassionate Centre continued to operate from the site. In 2010 the station also became home to the NATO Allied Rapid Reaction Corps (ARRC) which relocated from the Rheindahlen Military Complex in Germany.

References

External links

 BBC Gloucestershire: Salute to the end of an era at RAF Innsworth
 HQ Allied Rapid Reaction Corps
 Joint Casualty and Compassionate Centre (JCCC)

Innsworth
Installations of the British Army
Buildings and structures in Gloucester
Barracks in England